Robert E. Skrlac (born June 10, 1976) is a Canadian former professional ice hockey right winger.

Skrlac was drafted by the Buffalo Sabres in the 9th round, 224th overall, of the 1995 NHL Entry Draft. However, he never played a game for Buffalo. On June 17, 1997 he signed as a free agent with the New Jersey Devils. Skrlac played 8 games for the Devils in 2003–04. He never played in the NHL again but continued to play in the minors until he announced his retirement on September 27, 2005. He is now a Premium Seating Sales Manager for New Jersey Devils.

Career statistics

References

External links
 

1976 births
Living people
Albany River Rats players
Buffalo Sabres draft picks
Kamloops Blazers players
Mississippi Sea Wolves players
New Jersey Devils executives
New Jersey Devils players
People from the Regional District of Mount Waddington
Portland Pirates players
Sportspeople from British Columbia
Canadian ice hockey left wingers